The 2018 Big Ten Conference women's soccer tournament is the postseason women's soccer tournament for the Big Ten Conference for the 2018 season. It is held from October 28 through November 4, 2018. The seven-match tournament began with first-round matches held at campus sites, before moving to Grand Park in Westfield, Indiana for the semifinals and final. The eight-team single-elimination tournament consisted of three rounds based on seeding from regular-season conference play. Penn State is the defending champions. Minnesota beat Penn State in the tournament championship game on penalties 5–4 in seven rounds. Minnesota is the Big Ten Tournament Champion.It was the first Big Ten final ever decided on penalties and just the fifth to go to overtime (first since 2014), with the Golden Gophers becoming the fourth No. 7 seed to win the Big Ten Tournament title and the first since Wisconsin in 2005.

Seeds
Eight Big Ten schools participated in the tournament. Teams were seeded by conference record.

Bracket

Schedule

Quarterfinals

Semifinals

Final

All-Tournament team
Katie Murray, Illinois
Sarah Stratigakis, Michigan
April Bockin, Minnesota – Offensive Player of the Tournament
Emily Heslin, Minnesota
Maddie Nielsen, Minnesota – Defensive Player of the Tournament
Meg Brandt, Nebraska
Devon Kerr, Ohio State
Amanda Dennis, Penn State
Ellie Jean, Penn State
Amirah Ali, Rutgers
Dani Rhodes, Wisconsin

Statistics

Goalscorers 
3 Goals
 April Bockin – Minneosta

1 Goal
 Hope Breslin – Illinois
 Katie Murray – Illinois
 Cameron Murtha – Wisconsin
 Dani Rhodes – Wisconsin
 Marissa Sheva – Penn State

References

External links

 
Big Ten Women's Soccer Tournament